The Sentosa Satellite Earth Station is Singapore's first satellite earth station. The station is located at Sentosa Island. It was established on 23 October 1971. The second antenna was built two years later in 1972 as more traffic grows. This station is managed and owned by SingTel.

References

1970 establishments in Singapore
Earth stations in Singapore